Hamilton Rugby Football Club is a rugby union club based in Hamilton, South Lanarkshire, Scotland.

History

Established in 1927 as Hamilton Academy FP (former pupils) rugby club, they play their home games at Laigh Bent. Hamilton Rugby Club was chosen as Scottish Rugby's Club of the Year for the season 2017-2018 having been runner-up in 2014/15. The Bulls received the honour of BT Club of the Month for October 2014. At the end of that same season, the club received a further honour by being named as Glasgow Warriors, 'Greenbelt Community Club of the Season' at the Warriors' end of season dinner.

The Club invests heavily in Youth Development and boasts age group teams from Primary 1 through to under-18.  The club's under-18 squad is one of only 16 teams in Scotland to regularly qualify for the National U18 cup competition. 
In 2009, Hamilton RFC signed an agreement allowing British American Football League side The East Kilbride Pirates to play their home fixtures at Laigh Bent. This agreement ended in 2018.[For history of Laigh Bent playing fields, see article Hamilton Academy].

Hamilton Sevens

The club run the Hamilton Sevens tournament.

It is also one of the clubs that hosts the Lanarkshire Sevens.

Notable players

Glasgow Warriors

The following former Hamilton players have represented Glasgow Warriors at professional level.

Honours

Club

 Club of the Year
 Champion (1): 2017-18

Men's

 Scottish National League Division Two
 Champions (3): 2005–06, 2007–08, 2015–16
 Lanarkshire Sevens
 Champions (6): 1962, 1963, 1965, 1966, 1967, 1968
 Hyndland Sevens
 Champions (1): 1963
 Mull Sevens
 Champions (2): 2014, 2015
 Clydesdale Sevens
 Champions (1): 1990
 Drumpellier Sevens
 Champions (2): 1973, 1980
 Wigtownshire Sevens
 Champions (2): 1966, 1968
 Edinburgh Northern Sevens
 Champions (1): 2008

References

Scottish rugby union teams
Hamilton, South Lanarkshire
Rugby clubs established in 1927
Rugby union in South Lanarkshire